"Get Buck in Here" is a single by DJ Felli Fel. It features Diddy, Akon, Ludacris and Lil Jon. The track was released October 4, 2007.

The song features Diddy rapping the first and third verses, Ludacris on the second verse, Akon singing on the chorus, and Lil Jon on the outro. This single is produced by DJ Felli Fel himself. He also sings backing vocals on the track.

"Get Buck in Here" was certified Gold by the RIAA in April 2008. It is credited to being featured on the video game Midnight Club: Los Angeles.

Music video
The video premiered on Yahoo! Music on January 23, 2008. Cameo appearances by the Power 106 family, DJ Khaled, Pitbull, Juicy J, Fat Joe, Jermaine Dupri, Kevin Hart, and DeRay Davis. The video was directed by Rage.

Track listing

Promo CD single

Charts

References

Crunk songs
2007 debut singles
DJ Felli Fel songs
Akon songs
Sean Combs songs
Lil Jon songs
Ludacris songs
Songs written by Akon
Songs written by Ludacris
2007 songs
Music videos directed by Dale Resteghini